Sumpiruni (possibly from Aymara sumpiru hat (a borrowing from Spanish sombrero), -ni a suffix to indicate ownership, "the one with a hat") is a  mountain in the Vilcanota mountain range in the Andes of Peru. It is situated in the Puno Region, Carabaya Province, Macusani District. Sumpiruni lies west of Catautira. This is where the Ninahuisa River originates. It flows along the southern slopes of Catautira before it turns to the northeast.

References

Mountains of Puno Region
Mountains of Peru